Krasimir Stanoev (born 14 September 1994) is a Bulgarian professional footballer who plays as a centre back or defensive midfielder for Septemvri Sofia.

Career

Dunav Ruse
On 12 June 2017 he left CSKA Sofia to join the other Bulgarian First League team of Dunav Ruse.

Personal
In May 2020, Stanoev tested positive for COVID-19.

Career statistics

Club

References

External links

1994 births
Living people
Bulgarian footballers
First Professional Football League (Bulgaria) players
PFC Litex Lovech players
PFC Dobrudzha Dobrich players
OFC Pirin Blagoevgrad players
PFC CSKA Sofia players
FC Dunav Ruse players
SFC Etar Veliko Tarnovo players
Association football midfielders
Sportspeople from Blagoevgrad